{{DISPLAYTITLE:C20H20O8}}
The molecular formula C20H20O8 may refer to:

 Combretol
 3-O-Methylfunicone

Molecular formulas